Some Day (Traditional Chinese: (天天天晴) is a TVB modern sitcom series.

Cast
Ming family

Shek family

Ma family

Other cast

Awards and nominations
TVB Anniversary Awards (2010)
 Best Drama - Top 24
 Best Actress (Louise Lee) - Top 15
 Best Actress (Teresa Mo) - Top 15
 Best Supporting Actress (Aimee Chan) - Top 15
 My Favourite Male Character (Tsui Wing) - Top 15
 My Favourite Female Character (Louise Lee) - Top 15
 My Favourite Female Character (Teresa Mo) - Top 5

Viewership ratings

References

External links
TVB.com Some Day - Official Website 

TVB dramas
2010 Hong Kong television series debuts
2010 Hong Kong television series endings